Pledge (stylized as PL3DGE) is the fourth studio album by American hip hop recording artist Killer Mike. It was released on May 17, 2011, through SMC Recordings, Grind Time Official, Tree Leaf Records and Grand Hustle Records. The album's production was handled by Tha Bizness, No I.D., Flying Lotus, The Beat Bullies, DJ Speedy, Raz of the Beat Billionaires and Grind Time label-mates Smiff & Cash. The album, which is his third in the I Pledge Allegiance to the Grind series, was supported by the lead single "Ready Set Go", featuring Grand Hustle label-boss and fellow American rapper T.I.

Background
Killer Mike had started his recordings for Pledge in mid-2010 and throughout the beginning of 2011. He announced the first recording from the album, entitled "Ready Set Go" with production by No I.D., in late 2010. The album is the third in a series that started with I Pledge Allegiance to the Grind in 2006, and was followed by I Pledge Allegiance to the Grind II in 2008.

Music

Lyrical style
During an interview for HipHopDX, Mike commented on the political trend of the album saying:

Controversy with Jay-Z and Warren Buffett
Mike also talks to HipHopDX about Jay-Z and Warren Buffett contents on album, saying:

Singles 
Killer Mike released one single for the album. The song, titled "Ready Set Go", was released December 7, 2010 for digital download. The song was produced by No I.D., and features vocals from T.I. "Ready Set Go" failed to chart.

Reception

The album received favorable reviews overall, with Mosi Reeves of Spin giving the album a 7 out of 10, stating, "The former OutKast associate tones down the crack talk in favor of diatribes against Sarah Palin and Nancy Pelosi ("That's Life II") and the Christian church." The website Bonafide also rated the album as positive, with David Acaster introducing the album saying, "Fortunately he hasn’t taken the route of most New York rappers and declare it the death of hip-hop, an achingly boring tactic that never hides the fact that it’s bitter resentment. Instead it’s just served to make him hungry, and for large parts of Pl3dge he finds his own lane, standing above his peers from his illustrious hometown."

Track listing
The track list and its respectively chronology, production team and guests confirmed by HipHopDX.

References

Killer Mike albums
2011 albums
Albums produced by Tha Bizness
Albums produced by No I.D.
Grand Hustle Records albums
SMC Recordings albums
Sequel albums